Franco Ferreiro and André Sá defended their last year's title, defeating Adrián Menéndez and Leonardo Tavares 6–2, 3–6, [10–4] in the final.

Seeds

Draw

Draw

References
 Main Draw

Aberto Santa Catarina de Tenis - Doubles
2011 Doubles